Leonardo Vinicius Pereira Luiz (born June 5, 1987 in Rio de Janeiro), known as Leonardo Luiz, is a Brazilian footballer who most recently played as defender for Artsul.

Career statistics

References

External links

1987 births
Living people
Brazilian footballers
Association football defenders
Campeonato Brasileiro Série B players
Campeonato Brasileiro Série C players
Campeonato Brasileiro Série D players
Nova Iguaçu Futebol Clube players
Volta Redonda FC players
Clube Náutico Capibaribe players
Esporte Clube XV de Novembro (Piracicaba) players
ABC Futebol Clube players
Fortaleza Esporte Clube players
Bangu Atlético Clube players
Treze Futebol Clube players
Esporte Clube Santo André players
Artsul Futebol Clube players
Footballers from Rio de Janeiro (city)